David Martin Walsh (born July 23, 1931 in Cumberland, Maryland) is an American cinematographer. He worked with film directors including Woody Allen, Herbert Ross, and Arthur Hiller.

He started working in 1955 as an assistant animation cameraman at The Walt Disney Studios. During the 1960s, he worked as a camera operator on numerous big-budget features.

He won Primetime Emmy Award Outstanding Achievement in Cinematography for Entertainment Programming for a Special for Queen of the Stardust Ballroom in 1975.

Filmography 
Monte Walsh (1970)
I Walk the Line (1970)
Evel Knievel (1971)
A Gunfight (1971)
Corky (1972)
Everything You Always Wanted to Know About Sex* (*But Were Afraid to Ask) (1972)
A Brand New Life (1973)
Ace Eli and Rodger of the Skies (1973)
Cleopatra Jones (1973)
Sleeper (1973)
The Laughing Policeman (1973)
Born Innocent (1974)
The Crazy World of Julius Vrooder (1974)
Queen of the Stardust Ballroom (1975)
Whiffs (1975)
The Sunshine Boys (1975)
The Other Side of the Mountain (1975)
W.C. Fields and Me (1976)
Murder by Death (1976)
Silver Streak (1976)
Rollercoaster (1977)
The Goodbye Girl (1977)
Scott Joplin (1977)
House Calls (1978)
Foul Play (1978)
California Suite (1978)
The In-Laws (1979)
Just You and Me, Kid (1979)
Chapter Two (1979)
Hero at Large (1980)
Private Benjamin (1980)
Seems Like Old Times (1980)
Only When I Laugh (1981)
Making Love (1982)
I Ought to Be in Pictures (1982)
Max Dugan Returns (1983)
Romantic Comedy (1983)
Unfaithfully Yours (1984)
Country (1984)
Teachers (1984)
Johnny Dangerously (1984)
My Science Project (1985)
Outrageous Fortune (1987)
Summer School (1987)
Fatal Beauty (1987)
Taking Care of Business (1990)
Brain Donors (1992)
Carpool (1996)
Back When We Were Grownups (2004)

References

External links 

David M. Walsh Biography - film reference

American cinematographers
Primetime Emmy Award winners
People from Cumberland, Maryland
1931 births
Living people